Aleš Švehlík is a paralympic athlete from the Czech Republic competing mainly in category T38 distance running events.

Švehlík has competed in two paralympics, firstly in 2000 Summer Paralympics where he won a bronze medal in the 5000m and competed in the 800m.  He also went to the 2004 Summer Paralympics where he competed in the 800m and was part of the Czech Republics T35-38 4 × 100 m.

References

Paralympic athletes of the Czech Republic
Athletes (track and field) at the 2000 Summer Paralympics
Athletes (track and field) at the 2004 Summer Paralympics
Paralympic bronze medalists for the Czech Republic
Living people
Medalists at the 2000 Summer Paralympics
Year of birth missing (living people)
Place of birth missing (living people)
Paralympic medalists in athletics (track and field)
Czech male middle-distance runners
Czech male sprinters